Saint-Vincent-les-Forts (Vivaro-Alpine: Sant Vincenç dei Fòrts) is a former commune in the Alpes-de-Haute-Provence department of southeastern France. On 1 January 2017, it was merged with the commune of La Bréole to form Ubaye-Serre-Ponçon.

Population

See also
Communes of the Alpes-de-Haute-Provence department

References

Former communes of Alpes-de-Haute-Provence
Alpes-de-Haute-Provence communes articles needing translation from French Wikipedia
Populated places disestablished in 2017